Gull was a British record label founded in 1974. Owned by Gull Entertainments Ltd., it was associated with Morgan Sound Studio and was distributed by both Pye Records and Decca Records. It was also distributed by Motown in the US.

Its recording artists included Judas Priest, Arthur Brown, Steve Ashley, IF, Isotope and Seventh Wave.

The label was disestablished in 1984.

References

Rock record labels
Record labels established in 1974
Record labels disestablished in 1984